Birdsong was a three-part radio adaptation by Nick Stafford of the novel of the same title by Sebastian Faulks. It was first broadcast in the Classic Serial strand on BBC Radio 4 on 27 October, 3 November, and 10 November 1997. It was directed by Claire Grove. Its cast included Toby Stephens (Stephen Wraysford), Sophie Ward (Isabelle Azaire), John Rowe (René Azaire/Robert), Gavin Muir (Jack Firebrace), and Rachel Atkins (Elizabeth Benson).

Sources
https://web.archive.org/web/20110928031156/http://www.rlf.org.uk/fellowshipscheme/profile.cfm?fellow=48&menu=4

British radio dramas
1997 radio dramas
World War I fiction